is a Japanese light novel series written by Asari Endō and illustrated by Maruino. Takarajimasha has published thirteen volumes since 2012 under their Kono Light Novel ga Sugoi! Bunko imprint. The series is licensed in English by Yen Press. A manga adaptation with art by Pochi Edoya was serialized in Kadokawa Shoten's Comp Ace magazine between September 2014 and October 2015. An anime television series adaptation by Lerche aired in Japan between October and December 2016. An anime adaptation of the Restart light novel has been announced.

Plot

A viral, popular social network game known as the "Magical Girl Raising Project" has the ability to grant players a 1-in-10,000 chance of becoming a real-life magical girl. Each of the magical girls possess unique skills and special abilities and earn Magical Candies by protecting people and performing good deeds. However, at some point, the administration has decided that sixteen magical girls in a certain city is too many, announcing they will cut the number in half by having the magical girl with the fewest Magical Candies each week lose their powers. As the rules of the game get twisted out of control, the girls eventually find themselves dragged into a life-or-death battle against each other.

Media

Light novels
The first light novel volume was published on June 8, 2012 under Takarajimasha's Kono Light Novel ga Sugoi! Bunko imprint. Fifteen volumes have been published as of May 2021. Yen Press has licensed the series in English and began releasing translations of the light novels starting June 20, 2017.

Volume list

Manga
A manga adaptation illustrated by Pochi Edoya was serialized in Kadokawa Shoten's Comp Ace magazine between September 26, 2014 and October 26, 2015. It was collected into two tankōbon volumes released between June 26, 2015 and March 26, 2016. An adaptation of Magical Girl Raising Project: Restart, illustrated by Nori Senbei, began serialization in Comp Ace from June 2016. The first tankōbon volume was released on September 30, 2016. A spin-off manga illustrated by Ryouta Yuzuki, Magical Girl Raising Project FTP, began release on the Kono Light Novel wa Sugoi! WEB service from August 29, 2016.

Yen Press began releasing translations of the manga series starting December 19, 2017.

Volume list

Anime
An anime television series adaptation animated by Lerche and directed by Hiroyuki Hashimoto aired in Japan between October 1, 2016 and December 17, 2016 and was simulcast by Crunchyroll. An English simuldub by Funimation was streamed weekly during the summer of 2018, starting on July 29, 2018. The anime was released across four Blu-ray & DVD volumes containing three episodes each.

An anime adaptation of the Restart light novels was announced on January 29, 2023. Hiroyuki Hashimoto will reprise his role as director.

Episode list

Reception

Previews
The anime adaptation's first episode garnered generally positive reviews from Anime News Network's staff during the Fall 2016 season previews. Paul Jensen saw potential in this being a good series, highlighting the early character setup of Koyuki and the mobile game mechanics being used as a possible critique of the "dark and bloody approach" that magical girl shows took in recent memory. Jacob Chapman criticized the "laughable tone obfuscation and pregnant pacing", and that viewers will be aware of where the series is heading towards but commended Koyuki for being a "generally likable" heroine and the stylishly diverse cast of magical girls, concluding that this Madoka Magica imitation carries potential entertainment value. Theron Martin praised the decent animation, character aesthetics and the perverse intrigue of a blood-soaked magical girl competition but criticized the producers for stringing viewers with said promise shown in the opening. Nick Creamer praised the thoughtful introduction of its ensemble cast, the "grounded but funny approach" it takes with magical girls and the solid production having consistent and colorful animation, saying it's an engaging start that has him hooked to follow more episodes. Rebecca Silverman saw the obvious influences to Madoka and was optimistic of the show moving towards similar series like Nurse Angel Ririka SOS and Kamikaze Kaitō Jeanne in later episodes but felt it will go into the "presumed subversion of making magical girls into a violent murderfest" foreshadowed in the opening.

Series reception
Fellow ANN editor Amy McNulty placed Magical Girl Raising Project at number two on her top 5 best anime list of 2016, praising the contrast of "primal brutality with the cutesy art style" and the various ways the female ensemble approach the grisly game, concluding that: "While the series largely gets by on spectacle and shock value, many of its key players—good and bad—are flawed, complex, and sympathetic, and their respective backstories and motivations run the gamut from "downright silly" to "genuinely moving."" Martin reviewed the home video release in 2020 and gave it an overall B− grade, praising the magical girls for their varied outfits and diversity amongst its cast, the overall plot having decent story twists and action set pieces, but was critical of the tonal inconsistencies throughout the series.

Notes

References

External links
 

2012 Japanese novels
Action anime and manga
Anime and manga based on light novels
Battle royale anime and manga
Crunchyroll anime
Dark fantasy anime and manga
Fiction about death games
Fiction about social media
Funimation
Kadokawa Shoten manga
Kono Light Novel ga Sugoi! Bunko
Lerche (studio)
Light novels
Magical girl anime and manga
Magical girl light novels
Seinen manga
Survival anime and manga
Yen Press titles